Abdulrahman Mesbeh (Arabic:عبد الرحمن مصباح; born January 7, 1984) is a Qatari footballer. He currently plays as a full back .

Mesbeh was a member of the Qatar national football team from 2003 till 2007.

References

External links 
 
 

1984 births
Living people
Qatari footballers
Qatar international footballers
2004 AFC Asian Cup players
Al-Rayyan SC players
Qatar Stars League players
Qatari Second Division players
Qatar SC players
Al Ahli SC (Doha) players
Al Kharaitiyat SC players
Mesaimeer SC players
Al-Waab SC players
Asian Games medalists in football
Footballers at the 2006 Asian Games
Asian Games gold medalists for Qatar
Association football fullbacks
Medalists at the 2006 Asian Games